The 2016–17 season was Elche Club de Fútbol's 94th season in existence and the club's second consecutive season in the second division of Spanish football. In addition to the domestic league, Elche participated in this season's edition of the Copa del Rey.

Competitions

Results summary

Results by matchday

Matches

References

External links
Official website 
Futbolme team profile 
BDFutbol team profile

Elche CF seasons
Elche CF